In enzymology, a thioether S-methyltransferase is an enzyme that catalyzes the chemical reaction.

S-adenosyl-L-methionine + dimethyl sulfide  S-adenosyl-L-homocysteine + trimethylsulfonium

Thus, the two substrates of this enzyme are S-adenosyl methionine and dimethyl sulfide, whereas its two products are S-adenosylhomocysteine and trimethylsulfonium.

This enzyme belongs to the family of transferases, specifically those transferring one-carbon group methyltransferases.  The systematic name of this enzyme class is S-adenosyl-L-methionine:dimethyl-sulfide S-methyltransferase. Other names in common use include S-adenosyl-L-methionine:thioether S-methyltransferase, and thioether methyltransferase.

References

 

EC 2.1.1
Enzymes of unknown structure